Belkhir El Farouk (born 1948) is the Inspector General of the Royal Moroccan Armed Forces and the Commander of the Southern Military Zone. He was appointed as Inspector General by King Mohammed VI in 2021, replacing Abdelfattah Louarak.

Early life 
Belkhir El Farouk was born in the village of Id Bouchini, near Mirleft, in 1948. He was born into the Shilha  tribal confederation. He graduated from the Meknes Royal Military Academy in 1972 with the rank of second lieutenant. El Farouk obtained a Diploma of Higher Military Defense Studies in France.

Military career 
In 2006, he was appointed head of the 3rd office of the Royal Armed Forces' general staff. He was appointed Commander in Chief of the Southern Military Zone by King Mohammed VI in 2017. El Farouk led the military intervention to take control of a border crossing in Guerguerat, leading to the 2020–2022 Western Saharan clashes.

El Farouk was named Inspector General of the Royal Armed Forces by King Mohammed VI on 15 September 2021, replacing Abdelfattah Louarak.

Personal life 
El Farouk is married and has three children.

Decorations 

   Commander of the Order of the Throne

References 

1948 births
Living people
Moroccan generals
People from Guelmim-Oued Noun
20th-century Moroccan people
21st-century Moroccan people